Aditya is the Sun in later Hinduism.

Aditya may also refer to:

 Aditya (name)
 Ādityas, a group of Hindu deities
 Aditya (spacecraft), an Indian solar research spacecraft
 ADITYA (tokamak), a tokamak fusion experiment
 Aditya (boat), solar-powered ferry
 Aditya (actor) (born 1978), Indian film producer and actor

See also